My Truth is the second studio album by the Swedish singer Robyn. It was released on 17 May 1999 by BMG Sweden. Robyn collaborated with the producers Lindström & Ekhé, Christian Falk, Billy Mann, Thomas Rusiak and Masters at Work on the album. A pop, R&B and soul record, My Truth is an autobiographical album for which Robyn co-wrote all fourteen songs. Some of its lyrics reflect on the singer's fall 1998 abortion, which became controversial when RCA Records began planning a North American release. When Robyn refused to change the album after the label's request, plans to release My Truth outside Sweden were cancelled.

Swedish music critics generally praised My Truth, commending Robyn's growth as a songwriter. At the 2000 Grammis, the album received the Best Female Pop/Rock award. Overseas critics were divided in their opinions of My Truth; they found it more mature than the singer's debut album, Robyn Is Here (1995), but noted that it lacked catchy hooks. The album peaked at number two on the Sverigetopplistan albums chart, and was certified platinum by the Swedish Recording Industry Association (GLF). Four singles were released from My Truth: "Electric", "Play", "My Only Reason" and "Main Thing". "Electric", the album's lead single, was commercially successful, peaking at number six on the Swedish singles chart and certified gold.

Background
Robyn's debut studio album Robyn Is Here was released in Sweden in 1995, and was followed by a North American release two years later. The album sold 1.5 million copies worldwide, according to BMG Sweden, and yielded the top-ten singles "Do You Know (What It Takes)" and "Show Me Love". Robyn Is Here was certified platinum by the Recording Industry Association of America (RIAA) for shipments of one million copies in the United States. In 1998, Robyn returned to Sweden after nearly 12 months on tour in North America. She told Billboard, "I returned [to Stockholm] from my year in the U.S. [and] I was so extremely tired of everything, including myself and my music." Burned out, the singer took several months off. Robyn then began working on My Truth, enlisting Ulf Lindström, Johan Ekhé, Christian Falk, Billy Mann, Cherno Jah, Masters at Work, Ken Fambro and Internal Dread as producers; she had collaborated with Lindström, Ekhé and Falk on Robyn Is Here.

Development

Robyn co-wrote all of My Truth fourteen tracks. Although the singer returned to Sweden from North America in the summer of 1998, she returned to the US several times to work on the album. Several songwriters gave Robyn completed songs to record, but she considered it important to contribute to the writing process and said that most of the songs on My Truth originated with her. The album was written in four months. Robyn collaborated with a variety of producers, saying that she played around with the album's concept and was willing to experiment with different musical styles. Tired of the R&B of Robyn Is Here, the singer decided to explore house and rock music. About the album's title, she told Nerikes Allehanda that its songs expressed what was important to her and reflected her "truth" at the time.

Robyn asked her manager to enlist a house producer for the project after "falling in love" with New York culture in 1997. The following year, she began working with Little Louie Vega and Kenny "Dope" Gonzalez of Masters at Work. Althugh Robyn initially found it difficult to sing at a house tempo, she called it "liberating" when she became accustomed to it. After two weeks in the studio, "Main Thing" and "Good Thang" were completed. The former was chosen for the album, and the latter would be released as the B-side of a single. She joined Swedish rapper Petter for "Det gör ont ibland", a Swedish-language duet, after they visited a friend's country home. According to Petter, the song came together quickly despite their different musical styles. It was produced by rapper Thomas Rusiak, with additional production by Robyn and Lindström & Ekhé. She recorded "Healthy Love", another duet, with Cindy Heinold for the album. Photographer Eric Broms provided the artwork for My Truth, which sees Robyn wearing a feather headpiece designed by Sebastian Wahl.

Although the singer wanted My Truth to be positive in spirit, she acknowledged that "some sadness [is] expressed": "Every song is about something I've been through that I think is important to talk about. I have tried to turn these experiences into inspiring songs about my life." Robyn had an abortion in the fall of 1998, which she publicly disclosed several months later in an issue of Café. She wrote "Giving You Back" in February 1999, to help her cope with the abortion; when the album was completed, the singer called it one of the best songs she had written to date. Robyn began using songwriting as a coping mechanism during the production of Robyn Is Here, when she wrote "In My Heart" about her parents' divorce. She decided to have the abortion after much soul-searching. In a May 1999 Aftonbladet interview, the singer said that she would not wish an abortion on anyone because of the pain it caused her. Following the interview, Robyn experienced a backlash by some who felt that she impeded female liberation with her comments. In an August 1999 interview, the singer said that she wanted to draw attention to the abortion debate rather than her personal life. Although she supported abortion rights, Robyn acknowledged that the decision is a serious matter and should be treated as such.

Music and lyrics

Described as an autobiographical album, My Truth is a pop, R&B and soul record. About its mature tone, Robyn said that she had grown up since releasing her debut album and had gained life experiences which she wanted to express. She described the album's musical styles as more intense than those on Robyn Is Here, but retaining a mainstream appeal. John Lucas of AllMusic called the album "hardly a radical departure" from Robyn Is Here, but more mature with "intelligent and introspective" lyrics and greater focus on its lyrical content.

"Det gör ont ibland", with Petter, is a hidden track on the first track's pregap. Robyn described the duet as the "most hip hop" song she had recorded to date. Aftonbladet Per Bjurman described "Play" (the first track) as world music-tinged, and Lucas called it "as playful a song as [Robyn]'s ever recorded". It is followed by the R&B song "My Only Reason", whose lyrics describe a bad relationship. Next is "Underneath the Heart", a piano-guitar-and-string ballad whose lyrics describe the desire to help someone else feel better, which was compared by a critic to the catalogue of American singer Toni Braxton. The fourth track, "Electric", is an electronic funk song with reggae elements; it uses positive and negative energy as metaphors for the close relationship between love and hate. The title track has a "convinced relativism", according to Robert Christgau, and Robyn wrote the song in 1997 about feeling misunderstood. The sixth song, "Main Thing" (which samples Shot's 1986 single of the same name), explores the deep house, disco and funk genres. Robyn wrote the song (about her ex-boyfriend) in February 1999, while she was working with Masters at Work in New York.

The lyrics of "Healthy Love", featuring Cindy, describe feeling vulnerable in a new relationship due to bad experiences in previous ones. "Monday Morning", an acoustic pop song, was described by Bjurman as a "singer-songwriter visa". The ninth track, "Giving You Back", is a piano ballad which addresses Robyn's abortion: "I'm giving you back to where you came from but I'm not forgetting who you are". David Schmader of The Stranger wrote that the song has a directness "unprecedented in pop", and compared its piano elements to those in Braxton's work. The following track, "88 Days", has a pop and R&B sound. Robyn and Mann co-wrote it during winter, when spring was about 88 days away and they longed for sunshine. According to Lucas, its lyrics also refer to the singer's abortion. The last lines of "Long Gone" were taken from the film Contact (1997). The thirteenth and final track, "Universal Woman" (for which Robyn received sole writing credit), was written in ten minutes in a London hotel room. She singer said that the song is about girl power; women can be regarded as "strong", even if they "sacrifice" everything for love.

Release
My Truth premiered on the Torget.se website, where three songs were uploaded daily beginning on 14 May 1999. The album was released three days later (on 17 May) by BMG Sweden. The label held back on releasing the album abroad until they could present a "success story" to international distributors. My Truth debuted at number two on the Swedish albums chart and was certified gold by the Swedish Recording Industry Association (GLF), for sales of 40,000 copies on 18 May—the day after its release. The album sold 50,000 copies in its first four weeks, and remained on the album chart for 27 non-consecutive weeks (11 of them in the top 10). On 1 October 1999, My Truth was certified platinum by the GLF for sales of 80,000 copies. In 2001, Billboard reported that the album had sold over 130,000 copies in Sweden.

BMG initially reported a December 1999 international release, with "Electric" the first European single release in mid-August of that year. In June 1999, RCA Records (Robyn's international label) began formulating the marketing plans for the album in the United States; initial reports anticipated the release of an airplay single in September 1999, followed by the album in January 2000. In December 1999, Aftonbladet reported that Robyn would record new songs for an American version of My Truth or a new album, scheduled for release in the fall of 2000. Due to the lyrics which reflected on her abortion, RCA asked Robyn to re-record portions of the album for the American market and pop radio; according to a June 1999 article in the American music magazine Billboard, the singer had a miscarriage instead of an abortion.

Robyn refused to change the album; negotiations ended after six months, and the plans to release My Truth and its singles abroad were cancelled. Her manager, Alex Strehl, said: "I guess Robyn had moved in a direction that [RCA] didn't expect." Strehl told Aftonbladet that RCA felt that the album lacked potential hit singles. According to Robyn, the label wanted an album like Robyn Is Here and were not invested in My Truth. In 2001, she left RCA and entered a new record deal with Jive Records and Zomba. In 2018, Robyn reflected on the issue for a story in The New York Times: "You can't really talk about stuff like [abortions] in America, or you couldn't at the time. Not if you were an 18-year-old pop star." My Truth was eventually made available for streaming in the US in December 2014, although the hidden track "Det gör ont ibland" was omitted.

Singles
"Electric" was sent to Swedish radio stations on 22 March 1999 as My Truth lead single. Robyn first performed the song on the televised Miss Sweden beauty pageant at the Stockholm Concert Hall on 27 March 1999. It was released for purchase on 12 April 1999, with the radio edit and the extended album version. "Electric" was Robyn's third top-ten entry on the Sverigetopplistan singles chart, peaking at number six. On 18 May 1999, it was certified gold by the GLF for sales of 15,000 copies. The track was the sixth most-played song of 1999 on Sveriges Radio P3.

"Play" was selected as the album's second single in June 1999. It was released a month later, on 12 July, with the previously unreleased "Good Thang" as its B-side. BMG wanted to commission a music video to promote the single, but Robyn chose to use the video's budget to begin a nationwide tour. "Play" peaked at number 31 on the Swedish singles chart, Robyn's seventh consecutive top-40 entry on the chart. "Good Thang" was released as a promotional single on 20 October 1999. The album's third single, "My Only Reason", was released on 22 November 1999 with "Det gör ont ibland" its B-side. The single underperformed on the singles chart, appearing for one week at number 53. "Main Thing", released as the album's fourth and final single on 4 December 2000, did not chart.

Critical reception

Critical reception of My Truth was generally positive in the Swedish press. According to Aftonbladet, based on reviews by several newspapers when the album was released, it had an average score of 3.4 out of 5. Daniel Lindström of Östersunds-Posten praised it as the best Swedish soul album to date, singling out "Main Thing" as the album's best track. Göteborgs-Posten Patrik Lindgren praised the album's variety of musical styles, calling Robyn Sweden's top soul singer. Lindgren appreciated the album's not being fitted to the American market, which he found apparent with the lead single ("Electric"). According to Länstidningen Östersund Björn Bostrand, Robyn separated herself from other up-and-coming singers with My Truth by balancing maturity and youthful ambition. Bostrand praised the singer's vocal performance and the acoustic-pop songs "Not on the Inside" and "Monday Morning". Per Bjurman of Aftonbladet said that although Robyn Is Here lyrics were charming, My Truth demonstrated the singer's growth and maturity as a songwriter. Bjurman wrote that the album proved that Robyn was a full-fledged musician, and he called it one of the year's best Swedish albums.

A Helsingborgs Dagblad reviewer called My Truth one of the year's best Swedish records, praising its music, vocals, and lyrics. Although they felt that some tracks went unnoticed, the album was superior to Robyn Is Here. Magnus Persson of Borås Tidning considered My Truth a step in the right direction and recognized Robyn's songwriting, calling "Universal Woman" one of the album's best moments. Although Persson was less enthusiastic about the Mann-produced tracks, he praised the songs by Lindström & Ekhé and Masters at Work. A Nöjesguiden reviewer highlighted "Main Thing" and "Electric", but criticised what they called the album's cheap production. Karolina Ramqvist of Dagens Nyheter also disliked the "flat" production by Lindström & Ekhé and Mann, but said that Robyn's improvement as a vocalist redeemed the album. A writer for Dagens industri said that My Truth mature sound and low-profile approach would alienate her American teen audience. Svenska Dagbladet Stefan Malmqvist wrote that although it was an impressive record, My Truth was not engaging. Malmqvist praised the more-uptempo tracks, but felt that the album as a whole did not leave a lasting impression. In the same newspaper, Johanna Olofsson saw the album as weak and colorless but better-sounding when performed live.

Since My Truth was not released outside Sweden, it attracted little attention from foreign music critics. John Lucas gave the album a retrospective review for AllMusic, however, writing that "there are no truly weak moments" and calling it "much more organic and mature" than Robyn Is Here. Lucas felt that the album lacked "instant" and "irresistible" hooks, and criticised the "uniformity of sound that can make some songs drift in and out without really making any impression": "Not a commercial blockbuster then, nor a perfect listen, but this album does mark an important step forward for Robyn as an artist." Robert Christgau criticized My Truth in 2011, calling it "as strained as you might fear" and using it as an example of Robyn's "awkward stage that hits teenpop stars like clockwork".

Accolades
Patrik Lindgren of Göteborgs-Posten called My Truth the fifth-best Swedish album of 1999, regarding it a solid follow-up to Robyn Is Here. Aftonbladet reviewers selected it as the 21st-best album of the year. In 1999, My Truth was nominated for a Rockbjörnen as Swedish Album of the Year. The album earned Robyn her first Grammis at the 2000 awards in the Female Pop/Rock category. The jury called it a "brilliant" follow-up to her debut album, and praised its personal lyrics. The album was also nominated for Album of the Year, and Robyn was nominated for Artist of the Year.

Track listing

Notes
The 2014 streaming edition does not include the opening hidden track "Det gör ont ibland".
 signifies a co-producer
 signifies an additional producer

Credits and personnel
Adapted from the album's liner notes.

 Robyn – vocals, songwriting ; backing vocals ; co-production ; vocal production ; vocal arrangement 
 Arnthor – additional keyboards, recording 
 Mats Asplén – keyboards 
 Francisco Ballesteros – hair
 Steve Barkan – mixing 
 Katreese Barnes – backing vocals 
 Patric Berger – guitar 
 Britta Bergström – backing vocals 
 Stefan Boman – engineering 
 Donnie Boynton – piano ; songwriting 
 Eric Broms – photography
 Ralph Cacciurri – assistant engineering 
 Johan Carlberg – resonator guitar 
 Mike Ciro – guitar 
 Pär-Ola Claesson – strings 
 Sara Devine – backing vocals 
 Dave Darlington – mixing 
 Hernan "Boogie" Donoso – assistant engineering 
 Robin Dowling – assistant engineering 
 Per Ekdal – string arrangement 
 Johan Ekhé – backing vocal arrangement, backing vocal recording ; additional keyboards ; songwriting ; bass guitar ; guitar 
 Björn Engelmann – mastering 
 Almnils Erson – strings 
 Christian Falk – arrangement, bass, production, programming, recording ; mixing 
 Ken "K-Fam" Fambro – arrangement, production, recording ; programming ; songwriting 
 Leila Forstén – strings 
 Niklas Gabrielsson – handclaps ; drums ; tambourine 
 Kenny "Dope" Gonzalez – songwriting 
 Lars Halapi – guitar 
 Martin Hansen – engineering 
 Cindy Heinold – songwriting, vocals 
 Kenny Hickson – vocal arrangement 
 Angela Holland – backing vocals 
 Internal Dread – co-production, electric guitar, engineering 
 Cherno Jah – arrangement, instruments, mixing, production, recording 
 Janson & Janson – string arrangement 
 Henrik Janson – strings 
 Henrik Jonsson – mastering 
 Ronny Lahti – mixing 
 Lindström & Ekhé – additional production ; arrangement, instruments, production, recording ; mixing ; vocal arrangement, vocal production 
 Ulf Lindström – bass ; guitar ; songwriting 
 Gustav Ljunggren – horns, pedal steel guitar 
 Bernard Löhr – mixing 
 Billy Mann – arrangement, production ; songwriting ; electric guitar, recording ; acoustic guitar, backing vocals ; bass ; guitar ; organ ; vocal arrangement 
 Gunilla Markström – strings 
 Olle Markström – strings 
 Masters at Work – production 
 Pirjo Neimelä – styling
 Gene Perez – bass 
 Petter – songwriting, vocals 
 Paul Pimsler – guitar ; electric guitar 
 James Poyser – keyboards 
 Luisito Quintero – congas, percussion 
 Oscar Ramirez – assistant engineering 
 Antonella Reyner – makeup
 Rock-Owe – bass, piano 
 Thomas Rusiak – production, programming, songwriting, string arrangement 
 Stylee Scott – drums 
 S.N.Y.K.O. – strings 
 Stephen Simmonds – backing vocals 
 Brian Smith – engineering 
 Alex Strehl – A&R, concept, executive production, design
 Peter Swartling – A&R, executive production; heartbeat effect 
 Pål Svenre – additional keyboards ; keyboards 
 Esbjörn Svensson – piano 
 Titiyo – backing vocals 
 Little Louie Vega – songwriting 
 Sebastian Wahl – artwork, concept, design
 Roger Williams – songwriting

Charts

Certifications

Release history

References

External links

1999 albums
Robyn albums
RCA Records albums
Albums produced by Ghost (production team)
Soul albums by Swedish artists